Blackwater is a Scandinavian television drama made for SVT and ITV Studios by Piv Bernth and Apple Tree Productions. It is an adaptation by Maren Louise Käehne and Arrhenius of Kerstin Ekman's 1993 novel of the same name. It is directed by Karin Arrhenius and Mikael Marcimain, and stars Pernilla August. It had a Swedish premiere date of 23 January 2023 and was in competition at the Göteborg Festival. It has broadcast dates in France and Germany for March 2023.

Synopsis
In the mountains of North Sweden, near the small town of Blackwater, two tourists are found murdered in a tent in the 1970s. Repercussions of this event are still felt twenty years on.

Cast
Pernilla August as Annie
 Asta August as young Annie 
Alba August as Mia 
Rolf Lassgård
Magnus Krepper
Alma Pöystiis

Production
The series is an adaptation of the 1993 novel Blackwater by Kerstin Ekman, Sveriges Television ordered the production of the series in February 2020 from Apple Tree Productions, with co-production from ARD Degeto in Germany, and Filmpool Nord, and distribution internationally by ITV Studios. It was revealed that Maren Louise Käehne was scripting the adaptation and it would be directed by Pernilla August with Marek Wieser as director of photography and Anna Asp on production design. Käehne had first approached STV about an adaptation in 2017, Ekman approved Käehne's vision for the series and with Piv Bernth onboard as producer they developed the series to a greenlight with SVT. The COVID-19 pandemic delayed production and prevented Pernilla August from directing the series as had been announced with Karin Arrhenius and Mikael Marcimain taking responsibility and August and her daughters instead playing Annie, young Annie and Annie's daughter Mia.

Release
The series has been pre-sold across Scandinavia, to public broadcasters DR in Denmark, NRK in Norway, YLE in Finland and RUV in Iceland buying rights. The series will compete for the 2023 Nordisk Film & TV Fond Prize at the Gothenburg Film Festival held from 27 January 2023. The series has premiere dates in March 2023 in France, and Germany.

References

2020s Swedish television series
2020s drama television series